Rhode GAA is a Gaelic Athletic Association club located just outside the Village of Rhode in County Offaly, Ireland. With 30 Senior Football wins they are the most successful team in Offaly GAA football history.

History
The first recorded football match played by Rhode was on 17 March 1889 against Portarlington GAA. The outcome was a defeat for Rhode. The first appearance for Rhode in an Offaly football final was in 1891, however the match was unofficial and the facts about the match are unclear. Rhode's first official finals appearance was on 21 July 1900. It was also Rhode's first Championship win with the match ending Rhode 0−7, Daingean 0−2.

Handball
Fahy's Cross handball Club is located a mile north of Rhode, and is the Gaelic handball team of Rhode. The club, though small, has been successful over the years, with numerous Irish titles being won by Paddy Hope, David Hope and Nolie Murphy.

Notable players
Anton Sullivan, appointed Offaly captain in 2018

Honours
 Leinster Senior Club Football Championship Runners-Up 2006, 2008, 2010, 2014, 2016
 Offaly Senior Football Championships: 30
 1900, 1918, 1920, 1923, 1927, 1928, 1931, 1939, 1940, 1944, 1949, 1955, 1958, 1966, 1967, 1969, 1975, 1998, 2004, 2005, 2006, 2008, 2010, 2012, 2014, 2016 2017, 2018, 2020
 Offaly Intermediate Football Championships: (1)
 2011
Offaly Junior A Football Championships: (4)
 1917, 1994, 2003, 2008
 Offaly Junior B Football Championships: (2)
 Offaly Junior B Hurling Championships: (1)

References

External sources

External links
 Rhode GAA official website

Gaelic games clubs in County Offaly
Hurling clubs in County Offaly
Gaelic football clubs in County Offaly